The International Journal of Paediatric Dentistry is a bimonthly peer-reviewed medical journal covering research in Paediatric dentistry. It was established in 1991 and is published by  John Wiley & Sons on behalf of the International Association of Paediatric Dentistry and British Society of Paediatric Dentistry. It was formed from the merger of the journals of these two societies.

The journal publishes the following types of papers: Scientific articles, Reviews, Case reports, Clinical techniques, Short communications, and Abstracts of Current Paediatric Dental Research.

Abstracting and indexing 
The journal is abstracted and indexed in:

According to the Journal Citation Reports, the journal has a 2020 impact factor of 3.455.

References

External links
 
 International Association of Paediatric Dentistry
 British Society of Paediatric Dentistry

Pediatrics journals
Dentistry journals
Bimonthly journals
Wiley (publisher) academic journals
English-language journals
Publications established in 1991
Academic journals associated with learned and professional societies